North of Nome is a 1925 American silent action film directed by Raymond K. Johnson and starring Robert McKim, Gladys Johnston and Robert N. Bradbury.

Cast
 Robert McKim as Henri Cocteau  
 Gladys Johnston as Zelma Killaly  
 Robert N. Bradbury as Bruce McLaren  
 Howard Webster as Quig Lanigan  
 William Dills as Tate Killaly

References

Bibliography
 Jay Robert Nash, Robert Connelly & Stanley Ralph Ross. Motion Picture Guide Silent Film 1910-1936. Cinebooks, 1988.

External links
  
  

1925 films
1920s action drama films
1920s English-language films
American silent feature films
American black-and-white films
Films directed by Raymond K. Johnson
American action drama films
1925 drama films
Arrow Film Corporation films
1920s American films
Silent American drama films